Asia Muhammad was the defending champion, but lost to Myrtille Georges in the first round.

Marta Kostyuk won the title, defeating Viktorija Golubic in the final, 6–4, 6–3.

Seeds

Draw

Finals

Top half

Bottom half

References
Main Draw

Burnie International - Singles
Burnie International